William Beamish (30 May 1888 – 21 January 1969) was a French bobsledder. He competed in the four-man event at the 1928 Winter Olympics.

References

1888 births
1969 deaths
French male bobsledders
Olympic bobsledders of France
Bobsledders at the 1928 Winter Olympics
People from Thonon-les-Bains
Sportspeople from Haute-Savoie